Eileen Melvin, an economic development leader, is president and CEO of UMF Medical in Johnstown, Pennsylvania.

She was named to the PoliticsPA list of "Pennsylvania's Most Politically Powerful Women."

Biography
Eileen Melvin was named president and CEO of United Metal Fabricators, Inc.in 2009 and rebranded in 2012 as UMF Medical. The company is a manufacturer of exam and procedure room equipment for hospitals, physician offices, and clinics around the world.

Eileen earned a degree from Boston College and a Master of Public Administration from American University She began her career working at the American Enterprise Institute in Washington, DC and as a Legislative Aide to Senator John Heinz. specializing in health care issues of the Senate Finance Committee, and as a member of the Reagan Transition team.

For ten years, Melvin was president of Economic Development Strategies, a Woman Business Enterprise (WBE), guiding businesses and municipalities with projects to preserve and increase job creation.

She was appointed by Governor Schweiker in 2002 and reappointed by Governor Rendell in 2007 to the Pennsylvania Unemployment Compensation Board of Review (UCBR). Both appointments were approved by the Pennsylvania Senate. In 2012, Governor Tom Corbett appointed her as chairman of the UCBR.

In 1996, Melvin was unanimously elected vice-chair, and later chair of the Republican State Committee of Pennsylvania, serving a total of 10 years through numerous victories, including the election of Governor Ridge, U.S. Senators Rick Santorum and Arlen Specter, and winning majorities of the PA Congressional delegation, state legislature, and appellate courts.  She was appointed by Senators Specter and Santorum to the Federal Judicial Nominating Committing and served for 12 years. Melvin was named to the PoliticsPA list of "Pennsylvania's Most Politically Powerful Women."[1]

External links

 Women’s Independent Press | SBA honors Small Business Exporter of Year, Eileen Melvin
 
 
 Ironic moment illustrates value of cooperation
 Richland manufacturer showcases expansion
 McCort control given to board of trustees
 NEW - 'Hail Mary legislative pass' scores $35 million for Route 219
 In brief: Richland company honored

References

Living people
Pennsylvania Republicans
Chairs of the Republican State Committee of Pennsylvania
People from Somerset County, Pennsylvania
Boston College alumni
American University School of Public Affairs alumni
American women chief executives
Year of birth missing (living people)
21st-century American women